Deutsche Post AG, trading as Deutsche Post DHL Group, is a German multinational package delivery and supply chain management company headquartered in Bonn, Germany. It is one of the world's largest courier companies. The postal division delivers 61 million letters each day in Germany, making it Europe's largest such company. The Parcel division DHL is a wholly owned subsidiary claimed to be present in over 220 countries and territories.

Deutsche Post DHL Group is the successor to the German mail authority Deutsche Bundespost, which was privatized in 1995 and became a fully independent company in 2000. Since its privatization, Deutsche Post has significantly expanded its business area through acquisitions. 
In late 2014, the group acquired StreetScooter GmbH, a small manufacturer of electric vehicles. Two years later, the group acquired UK Mail, a business-focused postal service in the UK for US$315.5 million (£243 million). The former company became a division of the Deutsche Post European parcel network.

The 2016 earnings of Deutsche Post DHL Group before interest and taxes (EBIT) was €3.491 billion (up 44.8 percent over 2015), with a net profit of €2.64 billion on revenue of €57.334 billion. Return on equity, before taxes, was 27.7 percent. The group's long term credit rating, in November 2016, was BBB+ with a Stable outlook per Fitch's.
 
Deutsche Post AG is listed on the Börse Frankfurt (Frankfurt Stock Exchange) as DPW and is in the Euro Stoxx 50 stock market index. In 2016, 20.5% of the group's shares were held by the state-owned KfW bank; 79.5% were freely floating: 65.6% held by institutional and 10.8% by private investors.

Recent history 
Deutsche Post DHL Group has become a large, world-wide company in about two decades. The following are significant dates in the development into its current form.

2 January 1995: Deutsche Bundespost Postdienst becomes Deutsche Post AG; this is the company's privatization. The government of Germany still owns a large share of the company; the state development bank KfW owns 50 percent.
1998: Deutsche Post begins acquiring shares in DHL International. 
1999: Deutsche Post World Net acquires the Dutch distribution company Van Gend & Loos from Nedlloyd and in 2000 the Swiss distribution company Danzas. 
20 November 2000: Deutsche Post AG becomes a fully private company, with a new board of directors, in an IPO listed on the Frankfurt Stock Exchange. The government of Germany sells one third of its shares and KfW bank sells some of its shares.
December 2002: Deutsche Post AG acquires the remaining shares in DHL International.
August 2003: The company acquires the Seattle-based Airborne Express (est. 1946). The company integrates Van Gend & Loos, Danzas, Airborne Express, and its own EuroExpress into DHL to form DHL Express. 
December 2005: The group acquires the logistics company Exel in the UK, a £3.7 billion (€5.5 billion) takeover; Exel provided transport for corporate customers.
2006: DHL GlobalMail UK merges with Mercury International. 
December 2014: The group acquires StreetScooter GmbH, a small manufacturer of electric vehicles in Aachen, Germany. 
December 2016: The group completes the purchase of UK Mail, a business-focused postal service - "one of the largest integrated parcels and mail operations in the U.K." - for US$315.5 (£243) million. The former company becomes a division of the Deutsche Post European parcel network, although its web site reveals only a relationship with DHL Express.
February 2019: Through the instrumental moves of Frank Appel and Pablo Ciano, The group reaches an agreement with SF Express (SF Holding) for its supply chain operations in China.

Financial data

Corporate divisions

Post – eCommerce – Parcel division  

The postal division delivers approximately 61 million letters every working day in Germany, and provides services across the entire mail value chain, including production facilities at central hubs, sales offices and production centers on four continents.

This division inherited most of the traditional mail services formerly offered by the state-owned monopoly, for which it uses the Deutsche Post brand. Its exclusive right to deliver letters under 50 grams in Germany expired on 1 January 2008, following the implementation of European legislation. A number of companies are vying to challenge Deutsche Post's near monopolistic hold on letter deliveries, including Luxembourg-based PIN Group and Dutch-owned TNT Post. In 2002, Deutsche Post was granted a license to deliver mail in the United Kingdom, breaking Royal Mail's long-standing monopoly.

In 2016, in Germany alone, the Post – eCommerce – Parcel (PeP) division delivered over 1.2 billion parcels, an increase of 9.3% over 2015, much of it as result of shipping products purchased by customers on-line. The e-commerce aspect helped to generate a great deal of revenue. This division's revenue increased by 4.1 percent to €16.8 billion while earnings before interest and taxes (EBIT) increased by 30.8 percent to over €1.4 billion.

Express division 

The DHL Express division offers worldwide courier, express and parcel shipment service, combining air and ground transport, under the DHL brand. It owns five airlines: European Air Transport Leipzig, DHL Air UK, DHL Aero Expreso, SNAS/DHL and Blue Dart Aviation.

In 2016, this division's  revenue increased by 2.7 per cent to €14 billion. The operating profit before interest and taxes (EBIT) increased by 11.3% over 2015 to €1.5 billion.

Express is divided into business units along regions:
 Europe
 Asia Pacific
 Americas
 Europe, the Middle East and Africa

Global Forwarding – Freight division 

The DHL Global Forwarding division carries goods by rail, road, air and sea under the DHL brand and includes the DHL Freight operation which runs a ground-based freight network covering Europe, Russia and traffic into the Middle East. In 2016, this division's revenue declined by 7.7 percent to €13.7 billion but operating profit before interest and taxes (EBIT) improved from -€181 million in 2015 to +€287 million.

Supply Chain division 
The DHL Supply Chain division provides contract logistics and corporate information. In 2016, this division's revenue decreased by 11.6% to €14.0 billion versus 2015, but operating profit improved by 27.4% to €572 million.

The division consists of two main business units:
 DHL Supply Chain provides warehousing and warehouse transport for customers from a wide variety of sectors.
 Corporate Information Solutions handles documents (collection, digitalisation, printing, storage, archival) of all types.

In July, 2020, Deutsche Post DHL Group significantly increased earnings in Q2 2020 despite COVID-19.  Operating profit (EBIT) improved by around 16% to around EUR 890 million.

Electric van manufacturing

In December 2014 Deutsche Post DHL Group purchased StreetScooter GmbH, a small manufacturer of electric vehicles in Aachen, Germany. By April 2016, the company announced that it would produce 2,000 of the StreetScooter Work model in Aachen by year end.

The Work vehicle is equipped with lithium-ion battery packs and is powered by 30 kW asynchronous electric motors. The peak/continuous output is stated as 48 kW/38 kW. The range (before the need to recharge) is said to be  50 to 80 km, depending on the weight of the load and traffic conditions. The load capacity is 710 kg.

Deutsche Post's 2016 annual report indicates that it plans to replace its fleet of delivery vehicles in Germany with the electric StreetScooter products "in the medium term". Electric vans and trucks with a much greater range will be required to achieve the very long-term goal of replacing the group's entire fleet of approximately 70,000 vehicles with electric StreetScooter vehicles.

A mass production plan was announced in April 2016. StreetScooter GmbH would be scaling up to manufacture approximately 10,000 vehicles annually, starting in 2017. If that goal is achieved, it would become the largest electric light utility vehicle manufacturer in Europe, surpassing Renault which makes vans such as the Kangoo Z.E.

In addition to producing vehicles for Deutsche Post and DHL Express, StreetScooter has made marketing contacts with "numerous industries". A management board member told the media in March 2017 that one potential customer is considering a "very, very large number" of StreetScooters. More specifics would be announced in the next few months. The long-term business plan will require other types of models, some much larger, with entirely different equipment. StreetScooter showed a larger prototype, the Work L, in September 2016 that will provide double the capacity in cargo size; its load capacity will be 1,000 kg. The range (before recharging is necessary) is estimated at "up to 100 km". The company also announced that it was developing a Work Orange model with an "electro-hydraulic three-way dumper" for use by businesses that deal in trash or construction material handling. 

In 2021 plans for the sale of Streetscooter to Luxembourg-based Odin Automative, now B-ON, were reported.

Brands 
Deutsche Post – offers domestic mail services under its traditional name; the division is called Post - eCommerce - Parcel (PeP).
DHL – brand used as an umbrella brand for worldwide logistics services.
Power Packaging – supplier of food and beverage contract manufacturing and packaging services to North American companies.
StreetScooter – electric vehicle manufacturer owned by the group since December 2014.

See also 

Kaiserliche Reichspost

References

External links

 
 Deutsche Post Öffnungszeiten
 Deutsche Post

 
Postal organizations
Companies based in Bonn
German companies established in 1995
Transport companies established in 1995
German brands
Companies in the Euro Stoxx 50
Government-owned companies of Germany